Trần Tiểu Vy (born August 23, 2000) is a Vietnamese model and beauty pageant titleholder who was crowned Miss Vietnam 2018. She represented Vietnam at the Miss World 2018 pageant.

Early life and education
Tiểu Vy was born and raised in Quảng Nam, Vietnam. She is a student of Ho Chi Minh City Pedagogical University.

Pageantry

Miss Vietnam 2018
She was crowned Miss Vietnam 2018 on September 16, 2018 at the Phu Tho Indoor Stadium in Ho Chi Minh City. She succeeded outgoing by Miss Vietnam 2016, Đỗ Mỹ Linh.

Miss World 2018
She represented Vietnam at the Miss World 2018 pageant in Sanya, China on December 8, 2018. She was placed in top 30.

References

External links
 

2000 births
Living people
Miss World 2018 delegates
Miss Vietnam winners
People from Quảng Nam province
Vietnamese beauty pageant winners
Vietnamese female models
21st-century Vietnamese women